Luis Antonio Nery Gómez (born 1978 in Cabimas, Zulia, Venezuela) is a Venezuelan model who won the title of Mister Venezuela in 2000. He represented the Guajira Peninsula.

Nery was the official representative of Venezuela for the Manhunt International 2001 pageant in Beijing, China, on November 12, 2001, where he placed as the 2nd runner up.

In 2002 he moved to USA where he continued his career as a model working with several agencies and TV stations like Elite Models,
Wilhelmina, Univision Network, NBC/Telemundo,  among others.

He has been working as a Personal Trainer for the last 8 years and has helped people to get healthier and happier with their bodies.

References

External links
Manhunt International official website
Monarcas de Venezuela Blog
Miss Venezuela La Nueva Era MB

Male beauty pageant winners
Living people
1978 births
Exercise instructors